Dilobocondyla bangalorica is a species of ant in the subfamily Myrmicinae. This arboreal ant nests in dead wood and crevices in tree barks. The species name is after the type locality, Bangalore, where the ant was discovered in 2006.

The ants build their nest in the Frangipani plant species Plumeria alba and Plumeria rubra. While they live in colonies like other ants, they forage individually on tree trunks. The spines on the head and thorax are blunt, thus differentiating this species from others. When foraging, these ants raise their gaster high up in the air, very similar to the acrobat ants, Crematogaster. The species differs from other known species in the smaller size of worker and queen ants, the sculpted thorax and pedicel, colouration, six well defined mandibular teeth, and the lesser number of rugosities between the frontal carinae.

References

External links
Pictures of the ant, D. bangalorica

Myrmicinae
Bangalore
Hymenoptera of Asia
Fauna of Karnataka
Insects described in 2006